Breeana "Bree" Walker (born 28 August 1992) is an Australian bobsledder. She started as a hurdler and switched to bobsledding in 2016. In 2018–19 she made her debut in the Bobsleigh World Cup. She won several monobob competitions.

Career

Beginnings in athletics and switch to bobsleigh (until 2018)
Walker comes from the Melbourne suburb of Mount Evelyn. She began her sporting career as an athlete. She specialized in the running disciplines, particularly the 400-meter hurdles. After graduating high school, she trained at Doncaster Athletic Club and became Victoria's champion in the 400m hurdles in 2013. Her personal best was 1:00.7 minutes. In the mid-2010s, Walker received an athletics scholarship to the University of Arkansas at Little Rock, where she did not match the times she ran in Australia; the focus in US training was on building muscle mass, and the weight gain threw Walker into her benefits back. Upon her return to Australia, she was coached by Peter Fortune, Cathy Freeman's longtime coach.

In 2016, Walker decided to switch to bobsledding because she had set herself the goal of participating in the Olympics and had doubts about qualifying as a track and field athlete. As role models, she named two Australian hurdlers Jana Pittman and Kim Brennan, who had also changed sports; Pittman represented Australia as a bobsleigh pilot at the 2014 Winter Olympics, Brennan was the 2016 Olympic champion in rowing. Sliding Sports Australia (SSA) took Walker to the national team after attending a talent camp. In October 2016, she completed a self-financed training course to become a bobsleigh pilot at the Whistler Sliding Center in Canada.

In the 2017–18 season, Walker competed with brakewomen Mikayla Dunn and Ashleigh Werner in the 2nd division series of the North American and European Cups in order to meet the Olympic eligibility criteria, finishing five events on three different tracks. However, the team did not obtain the published performance and physical standards set by the national federation (Sliding Sports Australia) and agreed to by both the athletes and the AOC and were therefore not nominated for selection to the 2018 Winter Olympics in Pyeongchang.

Successes in monobob and debut in the World Cup (since 2018)

In the summer of 2018, the International Olympic Committee decided to include monobob in the Olympic program from 2022 as the second discipline in women's bobsleigh. Walker later described the appearance of the monobob as a "great opportunity", the use of uniform material also gave smaller nations the opportunity to compete at the front. She won the first non-racing women's monobob race in Lillehammer on 4 and 5 November 2018, defeating Margot Boch and Karlien Sleper. Two months later, she scored two third-place finishes with Jamie Scroop as a two-woman bobsleigh brake in the European Cup. The duo made their World Cup debut in mid-January 2019 and finished 13th on the track in Igls. In the winter of 2019–20, Walker won three more monobob events on the Königssee and La Plagne tracks. She also competed in other World Cup competitions with her new teammates Sarah Blizzard and Stefanie Preiksa; with Preiksa, she finished 14th out of 16 in the two-woman event at the World Championships in Altenberg.

Due to the COVID-19 pandemic and Australia's strict quarantine regulations, Walker stayed in Germany after the 2020 World Cup. She moved to Frankfurt with her partner, German bobsledder Christian Hammers. She trained at the Landesstützpunkt Wiesbaden, where she had worked regularly with Tim Restle since the summer of 2018 during her stays in Europe. On 12 December 2020, she won the second race of the women's Monobob World Series 2020–21 ahead of Laura Nolte in Innsbruck-Igls. The competition was the first monobob race to take place at the same location as the World Cup event in two-woman bobsleigh, in which the Walker/Blizzard duo finished eighth and thus achieved a top ten result for the first time. At the end of January 2021, Walker won a second monobob race in Igls. In the overall standings, she finished second behind American Nicole Vogt at the end of the season. After more top ten results, she placed eighth in the two-woman bobsleigh World Cup rankings.

At the Beijing Olympic Winter Games 2022, she placed 5th in the Women's Monobob Event on 14 February. She and Kiara Reddingius were placed 16th in the two-person bobsleigh.

Personal life
Walker currently studies a Bachelor of Health and Physical Education at Deakin University.

References

External links

1992 births
Living people
Australian female bobsledders
Olympic bobsledders of Australia
Bobsledders at the 2022 Winter Olympics
Sportspeople from Melbourne
21st-century Australian women
People from Mount Evelyn, Victoria
Sportswomen from Victoria (Australia)